Mohammad Nazim Uddin is a Bangladeshi Writer, Publisher and Translator. Due to his specialization in English, he initially translated several popular English novels and later started own writing under his inspiration. Which made him known as a very popular writer in Bangladesh and India also. He is well known for his popular books, Rabindranath Ekhane Kokhono khete Asenni.

Education and early life 
Mohammad Nazim Uddin was born in Dhaka, Bangladesh. He came out of Dhaka University after studying for one year in the Faculty of Fine Arts and obtained a post-graduate degree from the Department of Mass Communication and Journalism on the same university. He is the founding publisher of Batighar Prakashani in Bangladesh.

Translated books 
Mohammad Nazim Uddin took place in the minds of Bengali readers by translating famous foreign thrillers. This translator of more than 26 books later concentrated on writing original thrillers. The Responsive Novel The Vinci Code, Lost Symbol, Godfather, The Bourne Identity, The Bourne Ultimatum, The Day of the Jackal, The Silence of the Lambs, Red Dragon, Deception Point, Icon, Mona Lisa, Pelican Brief, Absolute Power, He has translated several notable books, including Avenger, Dante's Club, The Confessor, Slumdog Millionaire, and Firefox. Mohammad Nazim Uddin has written a total of 11 thriller novels. His notable books include Nemesis, Contract, Nexus, Confession, Karachi, Jhal, 1952 - Nichok kono Sonkha Noy, Pendulum, Keu Keu Kotha Rakhe, Rabindranath Ekhane Kokhono Khete Aseni etc.

Major works 
Notable among his novels are 'Nemesis', 'Contract', 'Nexus', 'Confession', 'Karachi', 'Jhal(Fake'), '1952 - Nichok Kono Sonkha Noy', 'Pendulum', 'Keu Keu Kotha Rakhe' and so on.

List of some of his basic books and publications ;

Beg Bastard Series 
 Nemesis (February 2010)
 Contract (February 2011)
 Nexus (February 2012)
 Confession (February 2013)
 Karachi (February 2015)
 Next (March 2022)

Rabindranath Series 
 Rabindranath Ekhane Kokhono khete Asenni (February 2015)
 Rabindranath Ekhane kokhono Asenni (February 2019)

KS Khan series 
 Jhal(Fake) (February 2013)

Other book 
 1952 - Nichok Kono Sonkha Noy (February 2014)
 Some Talk (December 2015)
 Pendulum (December 2017)

Popularity 
Mohammad Nazim Uddin's first published book was 'Nemesis', which was able to attract the attention of the reader as his original writing. It was the popularity of this book that inspired him to write four sequels in a row. These are 'Contract', 'Nexus', 'Confession' and 'Karachi'. Notable among the books of Mohammad Nazim Uddin are 'Jhal', '1952 - Is Not Just A Number', 'Pendulum', 'eu Keu Kotha Rakhe' etc. A total of 11 thriller novels have found a place in the whole of Mohammad Nazim Uddin's book till date. The most popular of these is 'Rabindranath Ekhane Kokhono Khete Ashenni', which has also got a huge response in West Bengal. It may be mentioned that the sequel of the book 'Rabindranath Ekhane kokhono aseni' was published in 2019 from both Dhaka and Kolkata on the occasion of the book fair. The famous Calcutta publication 'Abhijan Publishers' has also published Indian versions of the author's original thrillers. In addition, a web series directed by Indian director Srijit Mukherjie based on his novel was made for the Indian OTT Platform Hoichoi  A web series based on his other novel "Contact" has also been made in Bangladesh.‘Ainabaji’ star Chanchal Chowdhury and ‘Dhaka Attack’ famed Arifin Shuvo have played Black Ronju and Bastard respectively in the series. Zakia Bari Mom, Rafiat Rashid Mithila, Tariq Anam Khan and Shyamal Mawla have also played important characters on the show. Indian OTT Platform ZEE5 are the official OTT distributors of the show.

Reference 

Bangladeshi writers
Bangladeshi publishers (people)
Bangladeshi translators
Year of birth missing (living people)
Living people
University of Dhaka alumni